Flávio Ataúlfo de Coimbra (8th-century) was a Knight of Visigothic origin, Governor of Coimbra.

Biography 

Flávio was the son of Flávio Sisebuto de Coimbra (Judge of Coimbra). He possibly married an Ildoara Sueira. He had four sons: Teodorico; Ataulfo, Bishop of Tría; Hermenegildo; and Milena Usenda. A possible daughter was Ozenda, who might have been the wife or mistress of Bermudo I of Asturias, although this is unproven.

References 

725 births
770s deaths
Portuguese nobility
8th-century Visigothic people